The 1921 Victorian state election was held on 30 August 1921.

Retiring Members
No members retired at this election.

Legislative Assembly
Sitting members are shown in bold text. Successful candidates are highlighted in the relevant colour. Where there is possible confusion, an asterisk (*) is also used.

See also
1922 Victorian Legislative Council election

References

Psephos - Adam Carr's Election Archive

Victoria
Candidates for Victorian state elections